The Office! A Musical Parody is a musical with book and lyrics by Bob and Tobly McSmith, and music by Assaf Gleizner. It is a parody of the popular American television show, The Office.

History 
The show began performances at The Jerry Orbach Theatre on September 24, 2018, with an official opening on October 3, 2018. Opening night cast consisted of Sarah Mackenzie Baron, Michael Santora, Tom McGovern, Taylor Coriell, Katie Johantgen, Rebecca Mason-Wygal, and Ani Djirdjirian. The off-Broadway production was directed by Donald Garverick, with music direction by Tegan Miller.

The show temporarily closed due to the COVID-19 pandemic, and resumed performances on April 9, 2021, becoming the first musical to be staged in New York City following the pandemic. Cast members of the original series, Jenna Fisher and Angela Kinsey attended a performance in May 2022. The show currently runs at The Jerry Orbach Theatre at The Theater Center.

Musical Numbers

Act 1 

 Scranton (The Electric City)
 We Have Fun Here
 Sweet Little Moments
 That's What She...
 Not Gonna Close This Shop
 Assistant to the Regional Manager
 Sweet Little Moments (Reprise)
 Chris-O'Ween-Dwalaaka-Birth-A-Earth-A-Kwanzaa
 Such a Hot and Sexy Temp
 Little Moments (Reprise 2)
 You're the White One for Me
 Dundies

Act 2 

 Fun Run
 I've Got Chilli
 Kathy Bates
 Paper Cut Heart
 Candle Party
 I'm Nasty
 Chilli Reprise
 The Breakable Erin Hanlon
 Marry Me Beesly
 Threat Level Mid Afternoon
 That's What She Said (She Said She Loves Me)
 Finale

References 

Musical theatre
Musical parodies